Juan José Ibarretxe Markuartu (born 15 March 1957)  is a former president of the Basque Autonomous Community in Spain. Also a leading member of the Basque Nationalist Party (PNV) during the period, he held office from 2 January 1999 to 7 May 2009. Ibarretxe is an advocate of Basque independence by peaceful means.

Origins and early political career

He was born in Llodio in the province of Álava, and holds a degree in Economics from the University of the Basque Country. In 1983 he was elected a member of the Basque Parliament for Álava, representing the PNV, and from then on rose steadily to prominence. From 1986-1990 and 1991-1994 he was the President of the PNV Economic and Budgetary Commission. On 4 January 1995, then Basque President José Antonio Ardanza appointed him Vice President.

Lehendakari
On 28 March 1998, he was nominated PNV presidential candidate to compete in the October 25 Basque election, and became lehendakari (president) on 2 January 1999. In October 2003 he released the highly controversial Ibarretxe Plan (Plan Ibarretxe), which foresaw a future Basque country freely associated with Spain, with its own separate legal system and European Union (EU) representation. In October 2007 while in office he was prosecuted for holding talks with other political agents in search for a compromise leading to peace, considered illegal by the judge for the participation of former members of Batasuna.

Private life and hobbies
Ibarretxe grew up speaking only Spanish, but now speaks Basque acceptably and English. He is an avid cycling fan and has presided over a cycling club in Llodio. He is married and has two children. He is a non-practising Roman Catholic.

See also

 Basque nationalism
 Politics of Spain

References

External links
 
 New Opportunities for Peace in the Basque Area: A Discussion with Juan José Ibarretxe U.S. Institute of Peace, June 2006 (Audio, Remarks and Photos)

1957 births
Living people
Members of the 2nd Basque Parliament
Members of the 3rd Basque Parliament
Members of the 4th Basque Parliament
Members of the 5th Basque Parliament
Members of the 6th Basque Parliament
Members of the 7th Basque Parliament
Members of the 8th Basque Parliament
Members of the 9th Basque Parliament
People from Álava
Presidents of the Basque Government
University of the Basque Country alumni
Mayors of places in the Basque Country